The Black Dahlia Murder is an American melodic death metal band from Waterford, Michigan, formed in 2001. Their name is derived from the 1947 unsolved murder of Elizabeth Short, often referred to as Black Dahlia. Currently, the band consists of lead vocalist Brian Eschbach, bassist Max Lavelle, drummer Alan Cassidy, and guitarists Brandon Ellis and Ryan Knight. The Black Dahlia Murder has undergone various lineup changes, with Trevor Strnad and Eschbach remaining the only constant members, until the former's death in 2022, which then saw Eschbach take over lead vocals. Out of the nine studio albums they have released to date, the last eight have charted on the U.S. Billboard 200, with their fifth album Ritual peaking at No. 31 in 2011, marking them as one of the most popular contemporary American extreme metal bands. Their ninth and latest album Verminous was released on April 17, 2020.

History

Formation, Unhallowed and Miasma (2001–2006)

The Black Dahlia Murder began its inception during late 2000 and gained the final band lineup in January 2001. The group released their demo entitled What a Horrible Night to Have a Curse, and a four-track EP, A Cold-Blooded Epitaph, the latter of which the group released on Lovelost Records. After appearing in concerts such as the Milwaukee Metal Fest, The Black Dahlia Murder signed to Metal Blade Records in 2003.

Bassist Ryan "Bart" Williams left his former band, Detroit's Today I Wait, to tour with the Black Dahlia Murder. After touring with the band on their co-headlining gig with Throwdown and their European dates with Liar, he joined the group full-time, replacing former bassist David Lock. Frontman Trevor Strnad said that Lock was fired for incompetency. Williams was one of two engineers (the other being Walls of Jericho's Mike Hasty) on the band's first  album, Unhallowed. The band then went on a tour in late 2004 supporting Unearth alongside Terror and Remembering Never throughout the United States.

The band's second album Miasma was released on July 12, 2005, and peaked at No. 118 on the Billboard 200. After touring for Miasma, drummer Zach Gibson left the band along with Pierre Langlois. While Gibson went on to join Abigail Williams, Langlois left the band for a more secure lifestyle, and the band finished their search for a replacement drummer when they found former All That Remains drummer, Shannon Lucas. The group played at Ozzfest 2005.

Nocturnal and Deflorate (2006–2010)

Their third album, entitled Nocturnal, was released on September 18, 2007. The album debuted at No. 72 on the Billboard 200. The Black Dahlia Murder announced via their MySpace profile that they were going on a U.S. tour with Cannibal Corpse to promote their new album Nocturnal and celebrate the 25 years that Metal Blade Records had been in business. They were joined  by label-mates The Red Chord, Aeon, The Absence, and Goatwhore. In January/February 2008, the band embarked on a U.S. headlining tour with 3 Inches of Blood, Hate Eternal, and Decrepit Birth, followed by another alongside Brain Drill and Animosity. They were on Hot Topic's "Summer Slaughter Tour" with Kataklysm, Cryptopsy, Vader, Whitechapel, and Despised Icon.

Their longtime lead guitarist, John Kempainen left the band and was replaced by Ryan Knight during the beginning of 2009. In May 2009, The Black Dahlia Murder released their first DVD, "Majesty". The DVD contains a documentary and live footage from the Summer Slaughter tour and their tour supporting Children of Bodom in late 2008. The DVD also contains all of their music videos and behind the scenes footage.

The Black Dahlia Murder released Deflorate on September 15, 2009, via Metal Blade Records. The album sold 12,000 copies in the United States in the first week of the release, debuted at position No. 43 Billboard's Top 200 charts, No. 5 on Billboard's Independent Albums chart, No. 4 on Billboard's Top Hard Music Albums chart, and No. 50 on HITS Top 50 Albums chart. They toured with Children of Bodom and Skeletonwitch in support of the album. After their 2010 headlining tour with Goatwhore and Arkaik, the band began writing and recording their next full-length album.

Ritual and member changes (2011–2013)

In February 2011, The Black Dahlia Murder completed the songwriting process for their fifth studio album, entitled Ritual.  It was released on June 21, 2011, in North America. The band supported Amon Amarth on their May 2011 European tour, as well as headlined the 2011 Summer Slaughter tour, both in support of Ritual. Before the record's release, the track "Moonlight Equilibrium" was posted to the Metal Blade Records website on April 29, 2011, to critical and fan acclaim. A music video for "Moonlight Equilibrium" was released on February 20, 2012. In April 2012 during the New England Metal and Hardcore Festival on the first night performance, Trevor Strnad officially welcomed new bassist Max Lavelle into the band after former bassist Ryan Williams parted ways. On November 7, Shannon Lucas announced via a YouTube video that he would be stepping down as drummer of The Black Dahlia Murder to pursue other aspirations. Alan Cassidy of Abigail Williams filled in for Shannon's touring duties.

Everblack and Abysmal (2013–2016)
In early 2013, despite the news of the departure of two band members (drummer Shannon Lucas and bassist Bart Williams), plans were announced for an upcoming album release, to be entitled Everblack. Tentative plans estimated its release to be early summer 2013; likely June. On April 10, 2013, the iTunes Store was updated with official release and availability information, including cover art, a full track listing, and an official U.S. release date of June 11, 2013. The album has 10 tracks in total. On the same day, the band's first single from Everblack was made available for purchase and download, titled "Into The Everblack". The album itself was then released on June 11 and peaked at No. 32 on the U.S. Billboard 200.

On November 28, 2014 (the day after Thanksgiving), The Black Dahlia Murder released a 7" EP titled Grind 'Em All featuring 3 short grindcore covers of punk rock songs: a cover of "Ripped Up" by Left for Dead, of "Rebel Without a Car" by Sedition and of "Populous" by Gyga. The covers were originally recorded almost 10 years earlier during the era of Miasma. The EP was released as part of Record Store Day's Black Friday event via A389 Recordings (rather than the band's label, Metal Blade Records), made available for purchase on the band's online merchandise store and also streamed in its entirety via Exclaim!. The album art for Grind 'Em All was designed by Szymon Siech.

Lead guitarist Ryan Knight confirmed in early 2015 that the band will deliver a seventh studio release that year, followed by extensive touring, and that he is planning to start working on a solo album afterwards. Vocalist Trevor Strnad stated that the band's new album, titled Abysmal, will be "more raw and natural sounding" and feature "more dynamic and developed songs" than their previous work. "Vlad, Son of the Dragon", the first song from the album, was released online on June 24, followed by "Receipt" on July 22 and "Threat Level No. 3" on August 19. Abysmal was produced by Mark Lewis and Ryan Williams and released worldwide through Metal Blade on September 18. In early February 2016, it was announced that Knight had left the band. He was replaced on lead guitar by Brandon Ellis of Arsis.

Nightbringers, Verminous and Strnad's death (2017–present)
The band's 8th album Nightbringers was released on October 6, 2017, to critical and commercial acclaim, charting at 35 on the Billboard 200.

The Black Dahlia Murder released their ninth studio album, Verminous, on April 17, 2020.

On May 11, 2022, it was announced that the band's frontman Trevor Strnad had died. While no official cause of death has been given, the phone number for the National Suicide Prevention Lifeline was provided at the end of the statement.

On September 14, 2022, The Black Dahlia Murder announced a tribute concert taking place for Trevor Strnad on October 28 at Saint Andrew's Hall in Detroit, Michigan, supported by Darkest Hour and Plague Years. It was also announced that Brian Eschbach will be stepping down from guitar and taking over as lead vocalist as he states in an interview with Decibel Magazine; "I know Trevor would keep this band going if I went down a deep, dark path and weren’t here." In Brian's place, Ryan Knight will be returning to the band as the rhythm guitarist.

Tours

The Black Dahlia Murder headlined the 2008 Summer Slaughter Tour with Kataklysm, Vader, Cryptopsy, The Faceless, Despised Icon, Aborted, Born of Osiris, Psycroptic, and Whitechapel.
In late 2008, they joined a U.S. tour with Finland's Children of Bodom and Raleigh, NC's Between the Buried and Me. They were initially announced as "... with special guests" at the start of the tour, though it was later confirmed by Revolver Magazine that they were on tour. They appeared on the Hot Topic Stage in the 2009 Rockstar Energy Mayhem Festival. In late 2009, they embarked on a U.S. tour with Finland's Children of Bodom and Skeletonwitch. The band headlined the Bonecrusher Fest tour of Europe in Spring 2010 alongside 3 Inches of Blood, Necrophobic, Obscura, The Faceless, Carnifex and Ingested. In August 2010 they played at the Hevy Music Festival near Folkestone, UK. The band played the entire Warped Tour 2013. As a tribute to the 10th anniversary of the Nocturnal album, they headlined the 2017 Summer Slaughter Tour, performing the album in its entirety.

Musical style and influences

The Black Dahlia Murder has been described as melodic death metal, or simply death metal. Their 2001 demo What a Horrible Night to Have a Curse has been described as metalcore.

Influences for the band include heavy metal bands such as Carcass, At the Gates, Darkane, Dissection, Darkthrone, Morbid Angel, The Haunted, In Flames, Dimension Zero, Iron Maiden, Judas Priest, Metallica, Pantera and Megadeth. Vocalist Trevor Strnad cited on many occasions that he was primarily influenced by Carcass in vocalizing technique.

When asked to describe what kind of music the band plays, Strnad commented: 

 However, in an interview with Uranium Magazine, Strnad also stated,

Members
Current
 Brian Eschbach – lead vocals (2022–present), rhythm guitar, backing vocals (2001–2022)
 Max Lavelle – bass (2012–present)
 Alan Cassidy – drums (2012–present)
 Brandon Ellis – lead guitar, backing vocals (2016–present)
 Ryan Knight – rhythm guitar, backing vocals (2022–present), lead guitar (2009–2016)

Former
 Trevor Strnad – lead vocals (2001–2022; died 2022)
 John Deering – lead guitar (2001–2002)
 Mike Schepman – bass (2001)
 Cory Grady – drums (2001–2004)
 Sean Gauvreau – bass (2001–2002)
 John Kempainen – lead guitar (2002–2008)
 David Lock – bass (2002–2005)
 Ryan "Bart" Williams – bass (2005–2012)
 Zach Gibson – drums (2005)
 Pierre Langlois – drums (2006)
 Shannon Lucas – drums (2007–2012)

Timeline

Discography

Studio albums

Demos and EPs
 What a Horrible Night to Have a Curse (demo, May 2001)
 A Cold-Blooded Epitaph (EP, May 2002)
 Demo 2002 (demo, 2002)
 Grind 'Em All (cover EP, November 28, 2014)

Music videos

DVDs
 Majesty (May 12, 2009)
 Fool 'Em All (May 27, 2014)

References

External links
 
 
 

2001 establishments in Michigan
American melodic death metal musical groups
Heavy metal musical groups from Michigan
Metal Blade Records artists
Musical groups established in 2001
Musical quintets
Waterford Township, Michigan